Dniprorudne is a city in Vasylivka Raion of Zaporizhzhia Oblast, Ukraine. The population is

History 
Dniprorudne has had city status since 1970.

During the first weeks of the 2022 Russian invasion of Ukraine the city was captured by the Russian army. On 13 March 2022 the Ukrainian government accused the Russian military of abducting Dniprorudne's mayor Yevhen Matvieyev.

Demographics 
The city had 22,773 inhabitants in January 1989.

Transport 
The city has an inland port.

Gallery

References 

Cities in Zaporizhzhia Oblast
Populated places established in the Ukrainian Soviet Socialist Republic
Cities of district significance in Ukraine
Populated places on the Dnieper in Ukraine
Populated places of Kakhovka Reservoir
1961 establishments in the Soviet Union